Essence of Life is a performing art group based in Bangalore, established by Dega Deva Kumar Reddy in 2012 to promote teachings of Jiddu Krishnamurti.

Essence of Life is a synergy of five Indian classical dance forms - Bharatanatyam, Kuchipudi, Odissi, Kathak and Mohiniyattam. The group organized several dance performances across India in the past decade.

Naming
The name "Essence of Life" is inspired from Jiddu Krishnamurti's quote "Meditation is not a separate thing from life; it is the very essence of life, the very essence of daily living".

Philosophy
Inspired by Jiddu Krishnamurti's teachings, Dega Deva Kumar Reddy conceptualized and produced 'Essence of Life'. The dance form is based on basic human problems and emotions that Jiddu Krishnamurti often addressed in his talks and books - fear, suffering, jealousy, violence, hurt, love and death.

Prominent artists from established music and dance traditions across India came together to communicate Krishnamurti's teachings through Bharatanatyam, Kuchipudi, Odissi, Kathak and Mohiniyattam.

Theme

Art of Meditation
Dhyanasya Amukham - Introduction to Meditation
Dhyanasya Puravrttam - Myths of Meditation
Katham Jaagriti Jaayate - How does awareness come about
Dhyana kala - The art of meditation
Dhyanaartha kim yatharta maunam - What is true silence which leads to meditation

Essence of Life
Manovignaanam - Understanding our mind
Bhayaatah svatantramah - Freedom from fear
Samsayaa vina saadhyam kim jeevanam - Can we live without problem
Kim saadyam pumsaam parivarthanam - Can human being change
Rather saundaryam - Beauty of love

Finale
Thillana - Freedom from self

Dance form

Dance form | Ragam
 Bharatanatyam - Charukesi
 Kuchipudi - Surya & Huseni Kouns
 Kathak - Madhumad Sarang
 Odissi - Mishra Lavangi
 Mohiniyattam - Madhumad Sar

Artists and Musicians

Concept
 Dega Deva Kumar Reddy, Conceptualized and produced
 B Aruna Sivarama Krishna, Conceptual designer and music composer
 Dr Thiagarajan, Sanskrit translation

Dancers
 Smitha Madhav - Bharatanatyam
 Prateeksha Kashi - Kuchipudi
 Achuta Manasa – Kathak
 Pali Chandra - Kathak
 Masako Ono – Odissi
 Rashmi Menon – Mohiniyattam

Vocals
 Padma Vibhushan Hariharan
 Pt. Sanjeev Abhyankar 
 Pt. Raghunandan Panshikar, Lalitha Sharma
 Sooraj Santhosh, Saindhavi
 Varijashree Venugopal, Sangeetha

Instrumental
 Ustad Murad Ali Khan - Sarangi
 Bhuto & BV Balasai - Flute
 BV Raghavendra Rao - Violin
 Allam Durga Prasad - Gottuvadhyam
 Bhavani Prasad - Veena
 B Sivarama Krishna - Sitar
 Sarang - Sarod
 Balesh - Shehnai
 Shrikanth - Hawaii Guitar (Steel guitar)
 DA Srinivas - Mridangam
 Kesavan - Chanda, Idakka & Maddalam
 Venkatesh & B Ganesh Rao - Tabla
 Omkar & Jagadeesh - Pakhavaj
 Chandra Sekhar - Pakhavaj
 Manjunath - Percussion instrument
 DA Srinivas & Kesavan - Jathi
 Manjunath & Jagdeesh - Bhols

References

External links
 Essence of Life website

Dance schools in India
Organisations based in Bangalore
Dance education in India
Bharatanatyam
Kuchipudi
Odissi
Kathak
Mohiniyattam
Performing arts education in India
Indian classical music
Dances of India
2012 establishments in Karnataka